The 1951 Springfield Maroons baseball team represented Springfield College in the 1951 NCAA baseball season.  The team was coached by Archie Allen in his 4th year at Springfield.

The Maroons won the District I playoff to advance to the College World Series, where they were defeated by the Tennessee Volunteers.

During the Maroon's June 14th game against the Oklahoma Sooners, they drew a CWS record 15 walks off one just a single pitcher, James Waldrip. Springfield also set a 9-inning CWS record with 17 stranded baserunners.

Roster

Schedule 

! style="" | Regular Season
|- valign="top" 

|- align="center" bgcolor="#ccffcc"
| 5 || April  ||  || Unknown • Springfield, Massachusetts || 3–0 || 3–2
|- align="center" bgcolor="#ffcccc"
|  || April 21 || at  || Unknown • Worcester, Massachusetts || 2–4 || –
|- align="center" bgcolor="#ffcccc"
|  || April 28 || at  || Unknown • Cambridge, Massachusetts || 3–9 || –
|-

|- align="center" bgcolor="#ccffcc"
| 16 || May 30 ||  || Unknown • Springfield, Massachusetts || 2–1 || 12–4
|-

|- align="center" bgcolor="#ccffcc"
| 17 || June 2 || at UMass || Unknown • Amherst, Massachusetts || 3–0 || 13–4
|-

|-
|-
! style="" | Postseason
|- valign="top"

|- align="center" bgcolor="#ffcccc"
| 18 || June 4 || vs  || Unknown • Lowell, Massachusetts || 0–2 || 13–5
|- align="center" bgcolor="#ccffcc"
| 19 || June 5 || vs Brown || Unknown • Lowell, Massachusetts || 3–2 || 14–5
|- align="center" bgcolor="#ccffcc"
| 20 || June 6 || vs Brown || Unknown • Lowell, Massachusetts || 2–0 || 15–5
|-

|- align="center" bgcolor="#ccffcc"
| 21 || June 13 || vs Texas A&M || Omaha Municipal Stadium • Omaha, Nebraska || 15–8 || 16–5
|- align="center" bgcolor="#ffcccc"
| 22 || June 14 || vs Oklahoma || Omaha Municipal Stadium • Omaha, Nebraska || 1–7 || 16–6
|- align="center" bgcolor="#ffcccc"
| 23 || June 15 || vs Tennessee || Omaha Municipal Stadium • Omaha, Nebraska || 0–2 || 16–7
|-

References 

Springfield Pride baseball seasons
Springfield Maroons baseball
College World Series seasons
Springfield